The 8th SS Cavalry Division "Florian Geyer" was a German Waffen-SS cavalry division during World War II. It was formed in 1942 from a cadre of the SS Cavalry Brigade which was involved in the Bandenbekämpfung ("bandit-fighting") operations behind the front line and was responsible for the killing of tens of thousands of the civilian population. It continued "pacification" operations in the occupied Soviet Union, leading to further atrocities.

Formation

The training and replacement battalion of the division was involved in suppressing the 1943 Warsaw Ghetto Uprising. In March 1944, it was named after Florian Geyer (1490–1525), the Franconian nobleman who led the Black Company during the German Peasants' War. Veterans from the division formed the core of the 22nd SS Volunteer Cavalry Division Maria Theresia, following the latter's creation on 29April 1944.

Operational history

The newly created division was soon sent back to the Eastern Front and was stationed in the Rzhev and Orel sectors in central Russia until the spring of 1943, in the Army Group Centre Rear Area. As the Ninth Army planned the evacuation from the Rzhev salient in Operation Büffel in March 1943, the division took part in large-scale Bandenbekämpfung ("bandit-fighting") actions in the weeks before the operation, alongside elements of four Wehrmacht divisions and other SS and police units. An estimated 3,000 Russians were killed, the great majority of whom were unarmed: only 277 rifles, 41 pistols, 61 machine guns and 17 mortars were recovered. As part of the withdrawal, Ninth Army's commander Walter Model personally ordered the deportation of all male civilians, wells poisoned, and at least two dozen villages razed in a scorched earth policy to hinder the Red Army's follow up in the area.

The division was then moved to the area around Bobruisk, on internal security and Bandenbekämpfung duties until September 1943. In September the division was moved to the Southern front and took part in the German retreat to the Dnieper river.

The division was then sent to Hungary in October 1943, where the Panzerjäger and Sturmgeschütz battalions were combined and the Reconnaissance Battalion became a Panzer Reconnaissance Battalion. Following this reorganization the division was posted to Croatia but many new recruits were Danube Swabians (Shwoveh) drawn from Hungary in March 1944. In April 1944, they returned to Hungary and took part in the fighting in Transylvania after the Romanian front collapsed.

The division was trapped in the Siege of Budapest with the IX SS Mountain Corps when the Soviet and Romanian forces surrounded the city in December 1944. The division was destroyed in the fighting for Budapest, and by the end of the siege, of the 30,000 men of the SS Corps, only about 800 reached German lines.

Commanders

SS-Brigadeführer Gustav Lombard (March 1942 – April 1942)
SS-Gruppenführer Hermann Fegelein (April 1942 – August 1942)
SS-Obergruppenführer Wilhelm Bittrich (August 1942 – 15 February 1943)
SS-Brigadeführer Fritz Freitag (15 February 1943 – 20 April 1943)
SS-Brigadeführer Gustav Lombard (20 April 1943 – 14 May 1943)
SS-Gruppenführer Hermann Fegelein (14 May 1943 – 13 September 1943)
SS-Gruppenführer Bruno Streckenbach (13 September 1943 – 22 October 1943)
SS-Gruppenführer Hermann Fegelein (22 October 1943 – 1 January 1944)
SS-Gruppenführer Bruno Streckenbach (1 January 1944 – 14 April 1944)
SS-Brigadeführer Gustav Lombard (14 April 1944 – 1 July 1944)
SS-Brigadeführer Joachim Rumohr (1 July 1944 – 11 February 1945)

See also
 List of Waffen-SS units

References

Citations

Bibliography
Charles Trang, Florian Geyer Division, 2000,

Further reading
 

Waffen-SS divisions
Cavalry divisions of the Waffen-SS
Military units and formations established in 1942
Military units and formations disestablished in 1945